The concept of Seven Archangels is found in some works of early Jewish literature and in Christianity. In those texts, they are referenced as the angels who serve God directly.

Bible
The term archangel itself is not found in the Hebrew Bible or the Christian Old Testament, and in the Greek New Testament the term archangel only occurs in 1 Thessalonians 4 and the Epistle of Jude, where it is used of Michael, who in Daniel 10 is called 'one of the chief princes,' and 'the great prince'. In the Septuagint, this is rendered "the great angel."

The idea of seven archangels is most explicitly stated in the deuterocanonical Book of Tobit when Raphael reveals himself, declaring: "I am Raphael, one of the seven angels who stand in the glorious presence of the Lord, ready to serve him." The other two angels mentioned by name in the Bible are archangel Michael and angel Gabriel. The four names of other archangels come from tradition.

 tells about "seven rejoices" that are "the eyes of the Lord,
Which scan to and from throughout the whole earth." 
Revelation 8 mentions seven angels 
who "stand before God, and to them were given seven trumpets." Similarly, Revelation 16 indicates: "and I heard a loud voice from the temple saying to the seven angels: Go and pour out the seven bowls of the wrath of God into the earth." Lastly,Revelation 4 and Revelation 5 mention "seven Spirits" (
, ta hepta Pneumata, with the capital letter) -whose identity is not well specified- who are the "seven lamps of fire [that] were burning before the throne".

1 Enoch
One such tradition of archangels comes from the Old Testament biblical apocrypha, the third century BCE Book of the Watchers, known as 1 Enoch or the Book of Enoch, eventually merged into the Enochic Pentateuch. This narrative is affiliated with the Book of Giants, which also references the great archangels and was made part of the Ethiopian Orthodox Tewahedo Church's scriptural canon. Although prevalent in Jewish and early Christian apostolic traditions and the early Christian Fathers, the Book of Enoch gradually fell from academic and religious status, and by the seventh century was rejected from the canonical scriptures of all other Christian denominations, a banned and unknown work. The various surviving oral traditions recounted many differing lists of archangels. 

The names entered Jewish tradition during the Babylonian captivity (605 BCE). Babylonian folklore and cosmology, and early Mesopotamian beliefs under the dualistic influence of Zoroastrianism, centered around anthropomorphic and zoomorphic representations of stars, planets, and constellations, including the four sons of the Sky Father carrying the Winged Sun, the throne of Wisdom. First the prophet Daniel, then authors such as Ezekiel hebraized this mythology, equating the Babylonian constellations with abstract forms held to be "sons of the gods", angels of the Lord of Israel, and heavenly animal cherubim. The 2 BC Book of the Parables (Ch XL) names the four angels accompanying the Ancient of Days, standing before the Lord of Spirits, "the voices of those upon the four sides magnifying the Lord of Glory": Michael, Raphael, Gabriel, and Phanuel.

The Book of the Watchers (Ch IX) lists the angels who in antediluvian times interceded on behalf of mankind against the rogue spirits termed "the Watchers": Michael, Gabriel, Raphael, and Uriel.

Christian traditions

The earliest specific Christian references are in the late 5th to early 6th century: Pseudo-Dionysius gives them as Michael, Gabriel, Raphael, Uriel, Camael, Jophiel, and Zadkiel. In most Protestant Christian oral traditions only Michael and Gabriel are referred to as "archangels", which echoes the most mainstream Muslim view, whereas Roman-Rite Catholic Christian traditions also include Raphael to complete a group of three. Through its Byzantine tradition, however, the Catholic Church recognizes seven archangels altogether, sometimes named, sometimes unnamed other than the three mentioned above.

Lists of characters referred to as "angels" also exist in smaller religious traditions usually regarded as occultist or superstitious. A reference to seven archangels appeared in an 8th or 9th-century talisman attributed to Auriolus, a "servant of God" in north-western Spain. He issues a prayer to "all you patriarchs Michael, Gabriel, Cecitiel, Uriel, Raphael, Ananiel, Marmoniel.

Archangels in current church traditions

In the Catholic Church, three archangels are mentioned by name in its Biblical canon: Michael, Gabriel, and Raphael. Three Popes rejected to authorize worship of the purported names of the Seven Archangels within the Roman Catholic Church: Pope Leo XII (1826–1828), Pope Pius VIII (1830) and Pope Gregory XVI (1831-1832). The Directory on popular piety and the Liturgy (2001) at n. 217 states that "the practice of assigning names to the Holy Angels should be discouraged, except in the case of Gabriel, Raphael and Michael whose names are contained in Holy Scripture." 

Some Eastern Orthodox Churches, exemplified in the Orthodox Slavonic Bible (Ostrog Bible, Elizabeth Bible, and later consequently Russian Synodal Bible), recognize as authoritative also 2 Esdras, which mentions Uriel. 

The Eastern Orthodox Church and Eastern Catholic Churches of the Byzantine tradition venerate seven archangels and sometimes an eighth. Michael, Gabriel, Raphael, Uriel,  Selaphiel (Salathiel), Jegudiel (Jehudiel), Barachiel, and the eighth, Jerahmeel (Jeremiel) (The Synaxis of the Chief of the Heavenly Hosts, Archangel Michael and the Other Heavenly Bodiless Powers: Feast Day: November 8).

As well as Uriel, the Book of Enoch, not regarded as canonical by any of these Christian churches, mentions (chapter 20) Raguel, Saraqâêl, and Remiel, while other apocryphal sources give instead the names Izidkiel, Hanael, and Kepharel.

In the Ethiopian Orthodox tradition the seven Archangels are named as Michael, Gabriel, Raphael, Uriel, Raguel, Phanuel, and Remiel. In the Coptic Orthodox tradition the seven archangels are named as Michael, Gabriel, Raphael, Suriel, Zadkiel, Sarathiel, and Ananiel.

In Anglican and Episcopal tradition, there are three or four archangels in the calendar for September 29, the feast of St Michael and All Angels (also called Michaelmas), namely Michael, Gabriel, and Raphael, and often also Uriel.

Other traditions 
Other names derived from pseudepigrapha are Selaphiel, Jegudiel, and Raguel.

In Ismailism, there are seven cherubim, comparable to the Seven Archangels ordered to bow down before Qadar, of whom Iblis refuses.

In Yazidism, there are seven archangels, named Jabra'il, Mika'il, Rafa'il (Israfil), Dadra'il, Azrail and Shamkil (Shemna'il) and Azazil, who are emanations from God entrusted with care of the creation.

Various occult systems associate each archangel with one of the traditional "seven luminaries" (classical planets visible to the naked eye): the Sun, the Moon, Mercury, Venus, Mars, Jupiter, and Saturn; but there is disagreement as to which archangel corresponds to which body.

According to Rudolf Steiner, four archangels govern the seasons: spring is Raphael, summer is Uriel, autumn is Michael, and winter is Gabriel.

According to occultist Helena Petrovna Blavatsky, the Seven Archangels were a form of syncretism between different religions: they were the Chaldeans great gods, the Seven Sabian Gods, the seven Hinduist Manus and Seven Rashi, as well as the Seven Seats (Thrones) and Virtues of the Kabbalists.

In the early Gnostic text On the Origin of the World, the aeon named Sophia sends seven archangels to rescue the Archon Sabaoth and bring him to the eighth heaven.

See also 
 Angels of the Presence
 Chakra
 Classical planet
 List of angels in theology
 List of Mesopotamian deities#Seven planetary deities
 Seven churches of Asia
 Seven Factors of Awakening

References

Further reading 
Barker, Margaret (2004). An Extraordinary Gathering of Angels. M Q Publications. 
Barker, Margaret (1992). The Great Angel: A Study of Israel's Second God. London: SPCK; Louisville, KY: Westminster/John Knox Press. 
Barker, Margaret (2005) [1998]. The Lost Prophet: The Book of Enoch and Its Influence on Christianity. London: SPCK; Sheffield Phoenix Press. 
Nibley, Hugh (1986). Enoch the Prophet. Salt Lake City, UT: Deseret Book. 

Septets
Archangels
Christian terminology
Groups of Roman Catholic saints
Yazidi mythology